Baykali Ganambarr (born 30 August 1994) is an Yolngu actor and dancer. He  received the 2018 Marcello Mastroianni Award for his role in The Nightingale and was nominated for the 2019 AACTA Award for Best Actor in a Leading Role for the same role. He was nominated for the 2021 AACTA Award for Best Actor in a Supporting Role for his role in The Furnace.

After posting Youtube videos of himself dancing he joined Djuki Mala. While still with the group he was cast in The Nightingale which was his first acting role. In the film, which was released in August 2019, he played an Indigenous Tasmanian tracker named Mangana/Billy.

Ganambarr is from the Yolngu people and speaks Yolngu Matha. Ganambarr's older sister Rarriwuy Hick is an actress who appears in Cleverman.

References

https://www.theaustralian.com.au/weekend-australian-magazine/qa-baykali-ganambarr-actor-dancer-25/news-story/2793fa1f089c290fcc3440ee051d9369

External links
 

Living people
Australian male film actors
Indigenous Australian male actors
Marcello Mastroianni Award winners
1994 births
Yolngu people